In mathematics, rational reconstruction is a method that allows one to recover a rational number from its value modulo a sufficiently large integer.

Problem statement
In the rational reconstruction problem, one is given as input a value . That is,
 is an integer with the property that . The rational number  is unknown,
and the goal of the problem is to recover it from the given information.

Whenever  and a solution exists, the solution is unique and can be found efficiently.

Solution

One then repeats the following steps until the first component of w becomes . Put , put z = v − qw. The new v and w are then obtained by putting v = w and w = z.

Then with w such that , one makes the second component positive by putting w = −w if .

References

Number theoretic algorithms